David Maurice Lighty Jr. (born May 27, 1988) is an American professional basketball player for ASVEL of the LNB Pro A. He played college basketball at Ohio State University. Lighty ended his college career as the all-time leader in career games played in NCAA Division I men's basketball with 157, a record that eventually fell in 2022 to Jordan Bohannon of Iowa.

High school career
Lighty attended and played basketball at Villa Angela-St. Joseph High School. The Plain Dealer named him player of the year in 2005. Lighty averaged 22 points per game during his senior year and led VASJ to a state runner-up finish.

College career
Lighty did not see much playing time during his freshman year. He averaged 3.7 points and 2.3 rebounds in 16 minutes per game off the bench. During the NCAA Tournament, Lighty averaged 7.0 points per game and hit a game-tying 3-pointer late in the regional semi-final game against Tennessee. Lighty was moved into the Buckeyes' starting lineup for his sophomore year.

Lighty was injured in December 2008 and missed the rest of the 2008–09 season. He received a medical red-shirt for the year. Lighty returned for his junior season in 2009–10. As a junior, he averaged 12.6 points, 3.0 assists, 4.5 rebounds and 1.6 steals per game.

As a senior, he was picked to the Fifth Team All-America by Fox Sports.

Professional career
Lighty went undrafted in the 2011 NBA draft. On July 8, 2011, Lighty signed a two-year deal with Bennet Cantù of Italy. On December 6, 2011, he and Bennet Cantù agreed to part ways. On the same day, he signed with Guerino Vanoli Basket for the rest of the 2011–12 season.

In August 2012, he signed with JSF Nanterre for the 2012–13 season.

On September 30, 2013, he signed with the Atlanta Hawks. However, he was later waived by the Hawks on October 14, 2013.

On November 7, 2013, he re-signed with JSF Nanterre for the 2013–14 season.

On June 3, 2014, he signed a two-year deal with ASVEL Basket.

In July 2016, Lighty joined the New Orleans Pelicans for the 2016 NBA Summer League.

On July 24, 2016, he signed a one-year deal with Italian club Aquila Basket Trento. On December 18, 2016, Lighty scored a career-high 34 points in an 85-68 win over the Pallacanestro Varese.

On February 24, 2017, he left Trento and signed with Dinamo Sassari for the rest of the season.

On June 14, 2017, he signed a two-year contract with his former club ASVEL Basket. He extended his contract until 2024 on June 4, 2020.

The Basketball Tournament
Lighty joined Carmen's Crew, composed primarily of Ohio State alumni, in The Basketball Tournament 2020. He scored 21 points as the team was upset by House of Paign, 76–68, in the first round.

Career Statistics

|-
| align="left" | 2011–12
| align="left" | Bennet Cantù
|EuroLeague
| 5 || 8.9 || .385 || .200 || .750 || .8 || .4 || .2 || .0 || 2.8 
|-
| align="left" | 2013–14
| align="left" | Nanterre
|EuroLeague
| 7 || 30.4 || .429 || .346 || .556 || 3.9 || 2.7 || .7 || .6 || 11.3 
|-
| align="left" | 2015–16
| align="left" | ASVEL Basket
|LNB Pro A
| 45 || 23.7 || .437 || .269 || .756 || 2.3 || 2.3 || .9 || .1 || 8.7
|-
| align="left" | 2020–21
| align="left" | ASVEL Basket
|EuroLeague
| 27 || 22.9 || .465 || .354 || .814 || 2.6 || 1.7 || .9 || .2 || 9.8
|-
| align="left" | 2020–21
| align="left" | ASVEL Basket
|LNB Pro A
| 36 || 22.6 || .473 || .378 || .843 || 1.9 || 1.9 || .7 || .1 || 9.4
|-
|-class=sortbottom
| align="center" colspan=2 | Career
| All Leagues
| 120 || 23.0 || .453 || .326 || .781 || 2.3 || 2.0 || .8 || .1 || 9.1

Personal
Lighty is the son of David Sr. and Emily Lighty. Lighty has a son with WNBA Washington Mystics player Tayler Hill, who was born June 18, 2014.

See also
 List of NCAA Division I men's basketball career games played leaders

References

External links
 David Lighty at Euroleague.net
 College bio
 Career college statistics

1988 births
Living people
African-American basketball players
American expatriate basketball people in France
American expatriate basketball people in Italy
American men's basketball players
Aquila Basket Trento players
ASVEL Basket players
Basketball players from Cleveland
Dinamo Sassari players
Lega Basket Serie A players
Nanterre 92 players
Ohio State Buckeyes men's basketball players
Pallacanestro Cantù players
Shooting guards
Small forwards
Vanoli Cremona players
21st-century African-American sportspeople
20th-century African-American people